Riton (on Bulgarian:Дует Ритон) is Bulgarian pop duet, one of the most popular duets in the country.

History 
One of the most successful Bulgarian duets, Riton was founded in 1977 by Katya Mihaylova and Zdravko Jelyaskov. Katya and Zdravko are partners in the real life too. They met in the National Academy of Music. Katya is a singer and plays piano. Duet Riton started singing in Sofia and on the Black Sea. Their first name was "Studio 2"; later Luben Tsvetkov call them duet Riton. In 1978 Riton started their first tour in Poland. They starred in the Bulgarian VIP Brother 2015.

Discography 
 Embrace Me (1982)
 Duet Riton (1984)
 Love-Match (1986)
 Going at random (1987)
 Dzhalma (1994)
 Hurt from love (1998)
 All night (2001)
 The way to You heart (2015)

Sources 
 Official webpage

References

Bulgarian pop music groups